Spencer White  (born 22 September 1994) is a former professional Australian rules footballer who played for St Kilda Football Club in the Australian Football League (AFL). White was selected by St Kilda with pick 25 in the 2012 AFL Draft from the Western Jets in the TAC Cup.

White had to wait until the second last round of the 2014 AFL season to make his AFL debut, against Richmond, where he kicked three goals. He was delisted at the conclusion of the 2015 season.

White has signed with WAFL side Perth for the 2016 season.

He was once known as "Buddy" and Saints fans got very excited about his prospects.

References

External links

1994 births
Living people
Western Jets players
Australian rules footballers from Victoria (Australia)
St Kilda Football Club players
Sandringham Football Club players
Perth Football Club players